Karl Philip Michael Westerberg, better known by the stage name Manila Luzon (born August 10, 1981), is a Filipino-American drag queen, recording artist, comedian and reality television personality. Luzon came to international attention as a contestant on the third season of RuPaul's Drag Race and on the first and fourth seasons of RuPaul's Drag Race All Stars.

Luzon has also contributed to the compilation album series Christmas Queens.

Career

2011-2012: Breakthrough and RuPaul's Drag Race 

The publicity generated by her participation on the show brought many new opportunities to perform at various national and international LGBT events throughout the U.S. and Canada, including New York Pride and Vancouver Pride. She has been active in AIDS awareness and activism. After being featured in a Gilead Sciences ad titled "Red Ribbon Runway" with fellow Drag Race co-stars Carmen Carrera, Delta Work, Shangela and Alexis Mateo, the dress she was featured wearing was auctioned off by Logo in commemoration of World AIDS Day. Proceeds from the auction were donated to the National Association of People with AIDS.

In 2011, Luzon, along with third season Drag Race contestants Carmen Carrera and Shangela, appeared in a television commercial for travel-related website Orbitz. In addition to the commercial, she and Shangela also did an entertainment news segment for US Weekly where they discussed current male celebrities and reimagine them as drag queens. In August 2012, NiniMomo, a Long Island-based company specializing in poseable fashion dolls, released a doll in Luzon's likeness and wearing the now famous pineapple dress she wore during her time on Drag Race. The doll, which was available via special order, marked the first time a Drag Race contestant has been immortalized as a doll. Two years later, a couple of fans of Manila produced their very own 3D-printed Manila Luzon doll.

On 6 August 2012, it was announced that Manila was one of twelve past Drag Race contestants selected to join the cast of the first season of RuPaul's Drag Race: All Stars, which premiered on the Logo network on October 22, 2012. Paired with contestant Latrice Royale to form Team Latrila, the duo was eliminated in the third episode of the series that aired on November 5, 2012, placing in joint 7th/8th place. Their elimination was one of many who led to widespread criticism of the first installment of All Stars. On October 12, 2012, Manila appeared on an episode of the MTV series Made where she mentored a young man in the art of drag, allowing him to explore his drag alter-ego as he prepared for New York City's Gay Pride March. Prior to the airing of the season finale of RuPaul's Drag Race All Stars, Manila (along with All Stars contestants Raven, Latrice Royale, and Tammie Brown) appeared in a television commercial for travel website Orbitz's new portal for LGBT leisure travel. After the season, Luzon was a playable character with Pandora Boxx and Yara Sofia for the "RuPaul's Drag Race: Dragopolis" mobile app.

2018–present: All Stars 4, debut album and upcoming projects

On November 9, 2018, it was announced that Manila would return to All Stars 4, alongside fellow All Stars 1 Team Latrila team-mate Latrice Royale, but this time would compete separately against each other rather than as a team. Despite being one of the season's front-runners with three challenge wins, Manila was controversially eliminated by Naomi Smalls in the eighth episode of the season, which aired on February 1, 2019, ultimately placing sixth. On November 16, 2018, indie musician VELO released the single "Where My Man At," featuring Luzon and Drag Race season 9 and season 10 contestant Eureka O'Hara. The two also appear in the song's music video, together with Thorgy Thor, Ginger Minj and Trinity the Tuck). She later appeared as a guest for the first challenge in the premiere of season 11 of Drag Race. On February 1, 2019, Luzon released her single "Go Fish" alongside its music video. The video features fellow All Stars 4 contestant Naomi Smalls, Luzon's husband, and the Heathers, a prominent clique of Drag Race 3 contestants featuring Luzon, Raja, Delta Work, and Carmen Carrera. Following the buzz of her controversial departure in All Stars, the video received more than 300,000 views in less than 24 hours. Luzon made a guest appearance on General Hospital in late summer 2019. In June 2019, a panel of judges from New York magazine placed her 19th on their list of "the most powerful drag queens in America", a ranking of 100 former Drag Race contestants.

She is slated to host the reality competition series Drag Den.

Personal life
Westerberg took his drag name from the capital city (Manila) and the largest island (Luzon) of the Philippines, where his mother was born. His father is American. Westerberg grew up in Minnesota and resides in Los Angeles, but he also considers New York City home. A longtime resident of Manhattan, Westerberg resided in Harlem with his boyfriend at the time, Antoine Ashley (Sahara Davenport), who Luzon began dating in 2007 and was a contestant on the second season of Drag Race. Ashley later died of heart failure at Johns Hopkins Hospital in Baltimore on October 1, 2012. Westerberg studied graphic design at the University of Minnesota, Duluth.

As of 2013, Westerberg resides in Los Angeles, California where he moved shortly after Ashley's death. In November 2016, Westerberg proposed to his boyfriend Michael Alvarez, also known as Mic J Rez. On December 24, 2017, the couple wed at the Silver Bells Wedding Chapel, with an Elvis impersonator as the officiant.

Discography

Studio albums

Mixtapes

Remix extended plays

Singles

As featured artist

Other appearances

Filmography

Movies

Television

Music videos

Web

See also
 Filipinos in the New York metropolitan area
 LGBT culture in New York City
 List of LGBT people from New York City

References

External links

 
 
 

 
1981 births
Living people
Asian-American drag queens
American people of Filipino descent
American people of German descent
American people of Swedish descent
American LGBT people of Asian descent
LGBT people from California
LGBT people from Minnesota
LGBT Roman Catholics
American LGBT singers
People from Cottage Grove, Minnesota
Manila Luzon
Manila Luzon
21st-century American comedians